was a railway station on the Iwaizumi Line in Iwaizumi, Iwate, Japan, operated by East Japan Railway Company (JR East).

Lines
Asanai Station was a station on the Iwaizumi Line, and was located 31.0 rail kilometers from the opposing terminus of the line at Moichi Station.

Station layout
Asanai Station had a single side platform serving traffic in both directions. The station was unattended.

History
Asanai Station opened on 15 May 1957, as the initial terminal station for the Iwaizumi Line. The line was extended to Iwaizumi Station on 6 February 1972. The station was absorbed into the JR East network upon the privatization of the Japanese National Railways (JNR) on 1 April 1987.  The operation of the Iwaizumi Line was suspended from July 2010 and the line was officially closed on 1 April 2014.

Surrounding area
 Asanai Power Station
Japan National Route 340
Japan National Route 455

References

Railway stations in Japan opened in 1957
Railway stations in Iwate Prefecture
Iwaizumi Line
Defunct railway stations in Japan
Railway stations closed in 2014